Reboost is the process of boosting the altitude of an artificial satellite, to increase the time until its orbit will decay and it re-enters the atmosphere.

See also
 Orbital station-keeping
 International Space Station#Orbit
 Specific orbital energy#Applying thrust

References

Orbital maneuvers